The canton of Bitche is a canton of France, located in the Moselle department and the Grand Est region. Since the French canton reorganisation which came into effect in March 2015, the communes of the canton of Bitche are:

 Achen
 Baerenthal
 Bettviller
 Bining
 Bitche
 Bousseviller
 Breidenbach
 Éguelshardt
 Enchenberg
 Epping
 Erching
 Etting
 Goetzenbruck
 Gros-Réderching
 Hanviller
 Haspelschiedt
 Hottviller
 Lambach
 Lemberg
 Lengelsheim
 Liederschiedt
 Loutzviller
 Meisenthal
 Montbronn
 Mouterhouse
 Nousseviller-lès-Bitche
 Obergailbach
 Ormersviller
 Petit-Réderching
 Philippsbourg
 Rahling
 Reyersviller
 Rimling
 Rohrbach-lès-Bitche
 Rolbing
 Roppeviller
 Saint-Louis-lès-Bitche
 Schmittviller
 Schorbach
 Schweyen
 Siersthal
 Soucht
 Sturzelbronn
 Volmunster
 Waldhouse
 Walschbronn

See also
Cantons of the Moselle department
Communes of the Moselle department

References

Cantons of Moselle (department)